The Svínfellings (or Svínfellingar) were a family clan in the medieval Icelandic Commonwealth.  They ruled the Eastern Region of Iceland.  Their forefather was Flosi, one of the Burners of Njal.  Their name is derived from the clan's Svínafell homestead in Öræfi.

References
Árni Daníel Júlíusson, Jón Ólafur Ísberg, Helgi Skúli Kjartansson Íslenskur sögu atlas: 1. bindi: Frá öndverðu til 18. aldar Almenna bókafélagið, Reykjavík 1989

Icelandic family clans